Scinax similis is a species of frog in the family Hylidae.
It is endemic to Brazil.
Its natural habitats are moist savanna, subtropical or tropical dry lowland grassland, swamps, intermittent freshwater marshes, pastureland, rural gardens, urban areas, heavily degraded former forest, and ponds.

References

similis
Endemic fauna of Brazil
Amphibians described in 1952
Taxonomy articles created by Polbot